Strelište Sports Hall is an indoor arena in Pančevo. It has a capacity of 1,100 people. It is home arena of KK Tamiš.

See also
List of indoor arenas in Serbia

Pančevo
Indoor arenas in Serbia
Basketball venues in Serbia
Yugoslav Serbian architecture